Cyanothamnus subsessilis is a species of plant in the citrus family, Rutaceae and is endemic to the south-west of Western Australia. It is a woody, mostly glabrous shrub with simple leaves and flowers with four petals that are white on the front and green to blue on the back.

Description
The eight stamens are flat and hairy and there is a broadly egg-shaped appendage on the anthers. Flowering occurs from May to September.

Taxonomy and naming
This species was first formally described in 1863 by George Bentham and given the name Boronia subsessilis in Flora Australiensis from a specimen collected by James Drummond. In a 2013 paper in the journal Taxon, Marco Duretto and others changed the name to Cyanothamnus subsessilis on the basis of cladistic analysis. The specific epithet (subsessilis) is derived from the Latin word sessilis meaning "sitting" with the prefix "sub-" meaning "under", "from", "somewhat" or "less than".

Distribution and habitat
Cyanothamnus subsessilis grows on rocky hills and in sand between Toodyay, Denmark and Ravensthorpe.

Conservation
Cyanothamnus subsessilis is classified as "not threatened" by the Western Australian Government Department of Parks and Wildlife.

References

subsessilis
Flora of Western Australia
Plants described in 1863
Taxa named by George Bentham